BottleRock Napa Valley is an annual music festival held at the Napa Valley Expo in Napa, California.

The initial BottleRock was a five-day event that took place  May 8–12, 2013. The event featured three stages with 60 bands, including Jackson Browne, Train, The Black Crowes, Zac Brown Band, The Shins, Primus, The Avett Brothers, Joan Jett, Cake, Jane's Addiction, The Flaming Lips, Kings of Leon, The Black Keys, Alabama Shakes, The Iron Heart, Ben Harper, Violent Femmes, Café Tacvba, Rodrigo y Gabriela and Charlie Musselwhite. Furthur had been scheduled, but withdrew from the lineup due to an injury and health issues suffered by Bob Weir. It was the Napa Valley's first large-scale music festival. Forty local wineries were featured at the festival.
Although the festival attracted over 120,000 attendees and generated mostly positive reviews, several vendors and workers claim to have been left unpaid by organizers following the event. Estimates of well over $2.5 million for unpaid wages and services are being claimed by creditors including the City of Napa, venue provider Napa Valley Expo, a variety of security, catering and transportation companies, a local of International Alliance of Theatrical Stage Employees and individuals. To resolve financial woes, subsequent festival proceeds were used to partially pay off debts.

2014
A 2014 concert, organized by new ownership, took place on May 30 – June 1 at the Napa Valley Expo Center. The lineup of acts included The Cure, OutKast, Weezer, LL Cool J, Smash Mouth, Heart, Sublime with Rome, Third Eye Blind, De La Soul and Eric Church along with more than 45 additional artists and groups. Promoters for the 2014 event have indicated that they would pay off part of the unpaid debts incurred by the 2013 promoters.

2015
The 2015 festival on May 29–31 featured headliners Imagine Dragons, Robert Plant, No Doubt, and other popular acts including Public Enemy, Gipsy Kings, Los Lobos, Foster The People, Cage The Elephant, Portugal. The Man, Los Amigos Invisibles, The Avett Brothers, and Snoop Dogg.

2016
The 2016 festival which took place on May 27-29th featured headliners Stevie Wonder, Florence + The Machine and Red Hot Chili Peppers along with other popular artists; The Lumineers, Death Cab for Cutie, Lenny Kravitz, Walk the Moon, Rodrigo y Gabriela, Ziggy Marley and Grouplove.

2017
The 2017 festival, which took place on May 26-28th, featured performers including Tom Petty & the Heartbreakers, Maroon 5, Modest Mouse, Silversun Pickups, Foo Fighters, Live, and The Roots.

2018
The 2018 festival, which took place on May 25-27th, featured performers including Bruno Mars, The Killers, MUSE, the Chainsmokers, Halsey, Snoop Dogg, Incubus, Earth, Wind & Fire, Natalia Lafourcade, Head and the Heart, Billy Idol, Thievery Corporation, Phantogram, Tank and the Bangas, Mike D, Michael Franti & Spearhead, and Dean Lewis.

2019
The 2019 festival, which took place on May 24–26, featured performers including Imagine Dragons, Neil Young, Mumford & Sons, Logic, AJR, Cypress Hill, Gang of Youths, Too $hort, Pharrell Williams, Santana, OneRepublic, Nathaniel Rateliff, Tash Sultana, Sylvan Esso, Gary Clark Jr., and Lord Huron.

2021
The 2020 festival, which was scheduled for October, was to include Red Hot Chili Peppers, Dave Matthews Band, Stevie Nicks, Miley Cyrus, Khalid, Anderson .Paak & The Free Nationals, Zedd, Brandi Carlile, The Avett Brothers, Janelle Monae, Maggie Rogers, Blondie, Of Monsters and Men, Maren Morris, and Empire of the Sun. In July 2020, the festival was called off due to the COVID-19 pandemic, and rescheduled for September 2021.

References

External links

2013 in California
Napa, California
Music of the San Francisco Bay Area
Rock festivals in the United States
Festivals in the San Francisco Bay Area
2013 establishments in California
Tourist attractions in Napa County, California
Food and drink in the San Francisco Bay Area